Karmsundsposten was a Norwegian newspaper, published in Haugesund in Rogaland county, Norway.

Karmsundsposten was started in 1861, as the first newspaper in the middle-sized city. It took its name from the Karmsundet strait between Haugesund and Karmøy. In 1915 it was absorbed by the Labour Party newspaper Haugesunds Folkeblad.

References

1861 establishments in Norway
1915 disestablishments in Norway
Defunct newspapers published in Norway
Mass media in Haugesund
Newspapers published in Norway
Norwegian-language newspapers
Newspapers established in 1861
Publications disestablished in 1915